Massey Glacier is a tributary glacier,  long, draining the west slopes of Meier Peak in the Admiralty Mountains of Antarctica. It flows west along the south side of Wylie Ridge to join Man-o-War Glacier. Massey Glacier was mapped by the United States Geological Survey from surveys and U.S. Navy air photos, 1960–63, and was named by the Advisory Committee on Antarctic Names for C. Stanton Massey, a meteorologist at South Pole Station in 1968.

References

Glaciers of Pennell Coast